Zdeněk Dítě (19 November 1920 – 11 December 2001) was a Czechoslovak film actor. He appeared in more than 70 films and television shows between 1945 and 1991.

Selected filmography

 The Wedding Ring (1945) - Robert, mladý kníze
 Rozina, the Love Child (1945) - Tovarys u Karfa
 Hrdinové mlčí (1946) - Jan Tomek
 A Kiss from the Stadium (1948) - Jan Vanécek
 The Poacher's Foster Daughter or Noble Millionaire (1949) - Sedlon
 Revolucni rok 1848 (1949) - Mikovec
 Veliká prílezitost (1950) - Mirek Horák
 V trestném území (1951) - Benda
 Divotvorný klobouk (1953) - Musician Tomás Krepelka
 Kavárna na hlavní tríde (1954) - Detective
 Expres z Norimberka (1954)
 Severní prístav (1954) - nadporucík Halas
 There Was Once a King... (1955) - Gardener
 Punta a ctyrlístek (1955) - Officer Simek
 Návsteva z oblak (1955) - Martin Bláha - chairman of JZD
 Z mého zivota (1955) - Vítezslav Hálek
 Tanková brigáda (1955) - Pavlicek
 Hra o zivot (1956)
 Ztracená stopa (1956) - Leutnant Ruzicka
 Tri prání (1958) - Petr Holecek (voice)
 May Stars (1959) - Otec
 Dum na Orechovce (1959) - Dr. Svátek
 Cerná sobota (1961)
 Zacít znova (1964) - Sinker #1
 Komedie s Klikou (1964) - Pekárek
 Délka polibku devadesát (1965) - Architect
 Alibi na vode (1966) - nadporucík Kaláb
 Transit Carlsbad (1966) - Chmelícek
 Flám (1966) - Majitel auta
 Zenu ani kvetinou neuhodís (1967) - Milos
 Ukradená vzducholod (1967) - Generál
 Ta nase písnicka ceská (1967)
 Přísně tajné premiéry (1968) - Jakes
 Rakev ve snu videti... (1968) - lupic a dirigent jazzového orchestru Rudolf Venglos
 Bylo ctvrt a bude pul (1968) - Sedlák
 Prazske noci (1969) - (segment "Fabricius a Zuzana")
 Svetáci (1969)
 I Killed Einstein, Gentlemen (1970) - Rezisér
 Velká neznámá (1970)
 Lekce (1972) - Baum
 Smrt cerného krále (1972) - Komisar
 Dívka na kosteti (1972) - Reditel
 Výstrely v Mariánských Lázních (1973) - major Fulín
 Circus in the Circus (1975) - Italský porotce
 Profesori za skolou (1975)
 Bourlivé víno (1976) - Rudolf Zverina
 Osvobození Prahy (1977) - Ceský dustojník (uncredited)
 Almost King (1977) - Officer
 Já to tedy beru, séfe...! (1978) - Reditel
 Jen ho nechte, at se bojí (1978) - reditel Lidové skoly umení
 Dinner for Adele (1978) - Hotel manager
 Smrt na cerno (1979) - Zakaznik
 The Divine Emma (1979) - okresní hejtman v Prachaticích
 Pan Vok odchází (1979)
 Hodinárova svatební cesta korálovým morem (1979)
 Pátek není svátek (1980) - Reditel
 Co je doma, to se pocítá, pánové... (1980) - Karel Novák
 Romaneto (1981)
 Zlatá slepice (1981) - Formácek
 V podstate jsme normální (1981) - Director Ruzicka
 Calamity (1982) - Lesník
 Príste budeme chytrejsí, starousku! (1982) - Exner
 Samorost (1984) - Mariin otec
 Katapult (1984)
 Lucie, postrach ulice (1984) - Store Director
 ...a zase ta Lucie! (1984) - Director of Department Store
 Polocas stestí (1985) - Vrchní
 Láska z pasáze (1985) - Vedoucí prodejny
 Velká filmová loupez (1986)
 Smrt krásných srncu (1987) - Starosta
 Wolfgang A. Mozart (1991)

References

External links
 

1920 births
2001 deaths
Czech male film actors
Czechoslovak male actors
Male actors from Prague